Cator Lane is a tram stop on the Nottingham Express Transit (NET) network, in the district of Broxtowe and suburb of Chilwell. It is situated on reserved track close to a crossing over Cator Lane, and has side platforms flanking the track. Trams run at frequencies that vary between 4 and 8 trams per hour, depending on the day and time of day.

Cator Lane stop opened on 25 August 2015, along with the rest of NET's phase two.

References

External links

Nottingham Express Transit stops
Transport in the Borough of Broxtowe